The Calder Derby presented by Woodford Reserve is an American Grade III Thoroughbred horse race run annually in October at Calder Race Course in Miami, Florida. Contested for a current purse of $250,000 over a distance of  miles on turf, the race is open to three-year-old horses.

Inaugurated as the Hollywood Handicap in 1972, and open for horses age three and up until 1985, the name was changed to the Calder Derby in 1994.

Records
Time record: (at current  miles distance)
 1:47.70 – Crowd Pleaser (1998)

Most wins:
 2 – Opening Lead (1983, 1984)

Most wins by a jockey:
 2 – Gary Boulanger (1994, 1997)
 2 – Eibar Coa (2002, 2004)

Most wins by a trainer:
 2 – Manuel Azpurua (1983, 1984)
 2 – Elbert Ray Dixon (1990, 1991)

Most wins by an owner:
 2 – Brad D. Gay (1983, 1984)

Winners of the Calder Derby since 1999

 *Heavy overnight rain forced the 2005 race to be run on dirt.

Earlier winners 

 1997 – Blazing Sword
 1996 – Laughing Dan
 1995 – Pineing Patty 
 1994 – Halo's Image
 1993 – Medieval Mac 
 1992 – Birdonthewire
 1991 – Scottish Ice
 1990 – Zalipour
 1989 – Silver Sunsets *
 1988 – Frosty The Snowman
 1987 – Schism
 1986 – Annapolis John
 1985 – Gray Haze
 1984 – Opening Lead
 1983 – Opening Lead
 1982 – Glorious Past
 1981 – Poking
 1980 – J Rodney G
 1979 – Breezy Fire
 1978 – Ole Wilk
 1977 – What A Threat
 1976 – Chilean Chief
 1975 – Rimsky (DH)
 1975 – Strand Of Gold (DH)
 1974 – Amberbee *
 1973 – Willmar
 1972 – First Bloom

In 1974 Snurb won the race but was disqualified and set back to seventh place. 
In 1989 Big Stanley won the race but was disqualified and set back to sixth place.

References
 The Calder Derby at Pedigree Query

Flat horse races for three-year-olds
Horse races in Florida
Graded stakes races in the United States
Turf races in the United States
Calder Race Course
1972 establishments in Florida
Recurring sporting events established in 1972